Adventures of Kitty O'Day is a 1945 American comedy mystery film directed by William Beaudine and starring Jean Parker, Peter Cookson and Tim Ryan. It was a sequel to the 1944 film Detective Kitty O'Day. The two films were an attempt to create a new detective series but no further films were made. A third film, Fashion Model, also directed by Beaudine, was made using a similar formula but with another actress playing a heroine with a different name.

Plot
Amateur detective Kitty O'Day and her boyfriend are employed in a hotel. After the owner is shot, O'Day takes over the investigation despite the protests of the police.

Cast
Jean Parker as Kitty O'Day
Peter Cookson as Johnny Jones
Tim Ryan as Inspector Clancy
Lorna Gray as Gloria Williams
Jan Wiley as Carla Brant
Ralph Sanford as Mike, Police Detective Sergeant
William Forrest as Sauter
Byron Foulger as Roberts
Hugh Prosser as Nick Joel
Dick Elliott as Bascom, Hotel Guest
William Ruhl as Michael Tracey
Carl Mathews as Policeman
Constance Purdy as Woman in Ladies Spa

References

Bibliography
Gates, Phillipa. Detecting Women: Gender and the Hollywood Detective Film. SUNY Press, 2011.
Marshall, Wendy L. William Beaudine: From Silents to Television. Scarecrow Press, 2005.

External links

1945 films
1940s comedy mystery films
American comedy mystery films
American black-and-white films
1940s English-language films
Films directed by William Beaudine
Monogram Pictures films
Films produced by Lindsley Parsons
1945 comedy films
1940s American films